Black Bastards (stylized as BL_CK B_ST_RDS) is the second and final studio album by American hip hop group KMD, recorded in 1993 and eventually released on May 15, 2000, through Readyrock Records. Initially, the album was scheduled for release in May 1994, but Elektra Records canceled the album, reportedly due to the controversial cover art, which shows a Sambo figure being lynched.  Zev Love X's brother DJ Subroc was killed when he was struck by a car shortly before the album was completed, and subsequent releases of the album have featured dedications to him.

Elektra released promotional copies of Black Bastards and a cassette single of "What a Niggy Know?" prior to the album's cancellation. After KMD's disbandment, rarities and demo tracks recorded during the making of Black Bastards were released on a vinyl-only EP titled Black Bastards Ruffs + Rares in 1998. The album was re-released in 2001 by Sub Verse Music and again in 2008 by MF Doom's own Metalface Records.

Critical reception 

The album received generally positive reviews from music critics. Douglas Siwek of AllMusic said, "The sound of the record is very raw and sounds unfinished due to Elektra shelving the project, but it doesn't take away from the magic that would have made this a suitable follow-up." Steven Juon of RapReviews praised the album's lyrics but mentioned he "wish[ed] they would have taken a little more care in mastering and recording".

Track listing

Personnel 
Credits adapted from album's liner notes.

Personnel
 Dingilizwe Dumile – production
 Daniel Dumile – production
 KMD – production

Additional Personnel
 The CMOB – additional vocals
 Earth Quake – additional vocals
  – additional vocals
 J.Alvarez – additional vocals
 Lord Sear – additional vocals
 B.Thompson – bass guitar 
  – co-production 
 Sub – executive production
 Doom – executive production
 Cas – executive production
 Jay-G – executive production
 Yuri – executive production

Artwork
 The EMEF – cover illustration
 Scotch 79th – visuals

References 

MF Doom albums
2000 albums
Obscenity controversies in music
Race-related controversies in music